Ambegoda Liyanage Don Manoj Deshapriya (born 7 September 1981) is a Sri Lankan cricketer who generally plays in First class and List A cricket matches. He has played in 27 first class cricket matches and in 6 List A matches.

Fixing allegations 
Manoj Deshapriya has been banned from all forms of cricket from September 2017 for two years due to the alleged misconduct during a domestic first class cricket match between Panadura Cricket Club and Kalutara Physical Culture Club along with Chamara Silva who was the captain of the Panadura Cricket Club. Manoj Deshapriya, the captain of the Kalutara Physical Culture Club was found guilty for match-fixing allegations after the unusual scoring rate by Panadura side in a first class cricket match held in January 2017.

References

External links 

Papare

1981 births
Living people
Kalutara Physical Culture Centre cricketers
Panadura Sports Club cricketers
Moratuwa Sports Club cricketers
Tamil Union Cricket and Athletic Club cricketers
Sportspeople involved in betting scandals
Cricketers from Colombo
Sri Lankan cricketers